Emelianenko, Yemelyanenko or Emelyanenko is an East Slavic gender-neutral surname. It may refer to:

Alexander Emelianenko (born 1981), Russian mixed martial arts fighter, brother of Fedor
Fedor Emelianenko (born 1976), Russian mixed martial arts fighter, brother of Alexander
Maria Emelianenko, Russian-American applied mathematician
Vladimir Emelyanenko (born 1952), Russian astronomer
5617 Emelyanenko, a minor planet named after Vladimir Emelyanenko

See also
 
 
 

East Slavic-language surnames